Bhanwara  is an Indian Hindi language film. It was the third highest grossing Indian film of 1944. It was released in 1944. The film was directed by Kidar Sharma for Ranjit Movietone. It starred K. L. Saigal, Arun, Kamala Chatterjee, Monica Desai, Lala Yakub and Brijmala.

Set in the early 1940s, the film, a musical comedy is about two friends who arrive in the city to find jobs.

Plot
Two friends, Pancham (K. L. Saigal) and Rekhab (Arun) have just arrived in the city. They are looking for jobs and accommodation. Pancham interested in music, finds a job in a music and dance school to teach singing. There he meets Indu (Monica Desai), who teaches dancing to the students. She also happens to be his upstairs neighbour where he has rented a room. Indu lives there with her sister Bindu (Kamala Chatterjee). Rekhab manages to rent a room below a wrestler's (Lala Yakub) accommodation. The two friends fall in love with the two sisters. The wrestler helps Rekhab to develop his physique in order to impress his sweetheart. Through comic situations that follow, the film ends happily.

Cast
 K. L. Saigal
 Arun
 Kamala Chatterjee
 Monica Desai
 Lala Yakub
 Brijmala
 Kesari

Music
The music was composed by Khemchand Prakash with lyrics by Kidar Sharma, and a song written each by Swami Ramanand Saraswati and Pandit Indra.

Songlist

References

External links

1944 films
1940s Hindi-language films
Indian black-and-white films
Indian musical comedy films
1944 musical comedy films